Escape from Fort Bravo is a 1953 American Anscocolor Western film set during the American Civil War. Directed by John Sturges it stars William Holden, Eleanor Parker, and John Forsythe.

Plot
Fort Bravo is a Union prison camp with a strict disciplinarian named Captain Roper (William Holden). A pretty woman named Carla Forester (Eleanor Parker) shows up to help with a wedding of her friend but is really there to assist in freeing some prisoners including her previous beau Confederate Captain John Marsh (John Forsythe). Roper falls in love with her (and she with him) and the escape happens after the wedding celebrations and Carla goes with the 4 confederate escapees. This gives Roper an additional motive to recapture the escapees. He does just that, but on the way back to the fort, they are attacked by fierce Mescalero Apaches who are hostile to both sides and the group ends up trapped in a shallow exposed depression. Roper frees and arms his prisoners, but even then, it looks like the Apaches will wipe them out. Bailey (John Lupton), a proven coward, escapes when one of their loose horses returns in the night. One by one, the rest of the group are killed, including Campbell (William Demarest), Young (William Campbell), and the Kiowa guide. Marsh and Lieutenant Beecher (Richard Anderson) are wounded. The next morning, to try to save Carla, Roper makes it look like he is the only one left alive and walks out in plain view. He is wounded, but the cavalry comes to the rescue just in time. Roper thanks Bailey for coming with help, while Marsh dies after smiling at Bailey who has come through and shown he is not a coward.

Cast
 William Holden as Captain Roper
 Eleanor Parker as Carla Forester
 John Forsythe as Captain John Marsh
 William Demarest as Sgt. Campbell
 William Campbell as Cabot Young
 Polly Bergen as Alice Owens
 Richard Anderson as Lieutenant Beecher
 Carl Benton Reid as Colonel Owens
 John Lupton as Bailey
 Forrest Lewis (uncredited) as Dr. Miller
 Howard McNear (uncredited) as Watson
 Glenn Strange appears briefly (uncredited) as Sgt. Compton
Several members of the supporting cast would have notable careers in television shows of the 1960s and ‘70s.

Production notes
The working titles of this film were Rope's End and Fort Bravo. Production ran from April until late May-1953. Most of the film was shot on location in Gallup, New Mexico and Death Valley National Park.

Reception
The film received a mixed review from Howard Thompson of The New York Times. While he found Sturges's direction full of "professional smoothness," he had many problems with Frank Fenton's "fuzzily defined" characters. The cast, he goes on, "seems confused throughout." Leonard Maltin disagreed, calling the film "well-executed" and awarding it three stars in his independent movie review guide.

The film serves as an inspiration for the fifth title in the Belgian comic book series Les Tuniques Bleues (The Bluecoats) by Raoul Cauvin and Willy Lambil, a graphic novel titled "Les Déserteurs" (1975)

Box office
According to MGM records, the film earned $1,525,000 in the US and Canada and $1,633,000 elsewhere, resulting in a profit of $104,000.

References

External links

 
 
 
 
 

1953 Western (genre) films
1953 films
1950s prison films
American Civil War films
American Western (genre) films
Films about prison escapes
Films directed by John Sturges
Metro-Goldwyn-Mayer films
1950s English-language films
1950s American films